The Richmond Vampire (also called locally the Hollywood Vampire) is a recent urban legend from Richmond, Virginia.

Local residents claim that the mausoleum of W. W. Pool (Dated 1913) in Hollywood Cemetery holds the remains of a vampire. Supposedly Pool was run out of England in the 1800s for being a vampire. Oral legends to this effect were circulating by the 1960s. They may be influenced by the architecture of the tomb, which has both Masonic and ancient Egyptian elements, and double Ws looking like fangs. Because this cemetery is adjacent to Virginia Commonwealth University, the story became popular among students, especially from the 1980s onward. It was first mentioned in print in the student newspaper Commonwealth Times in 1976.

Since 2001, the vampire story has been combined with the collapse of the Chesapeake and Ohio Railroad's Church Hill Tunnel under Church Hill, a neighborhood of eastern Richmond, Virginia, which buried several workers alive on October 2, 1925. This part of the story showed up online in 2001 and was first reported in print in 2007 in Haunted Richmond: The Shadows of Shockoe.

According to this newer story, the tunneling awakened an ancient evil that lived under Church Hill and brought the tunnel crashing down on the workers. Rescue teams found an unearthly blood-covered creature with jagged teeth and skin hanging from its muscular body crouching over one of the victims. The creature escaped from the cave-in and raced toward the James River. Pursued by a group of men, the creature took refuge in Hollywood Cemetery (2.2 miles away), where it disappeared in a mausoleum built into a hillside bearing the name W. W. Pool.

According to Gregory Maitland, an urban legend and folklore researcher with the paranormal research groups Night Shift and the Virginia Ghosts & Haunting Research Society, the "creature" that escaped the tunnel collapse was actually the 28-year-old railroad fireman, Benjamin F. Mosby (1896-1925), who had been shoveling coal into the firebox of a steam locomotive of a work train with no shirt on when the cave-in occurred and the boiler ruptured. Mosby's upper body was horribly scalded and several of his teeth were broken before he made his way through the opening of the tunnel. Witnesses reported he was in shock and layers of his skin were hanging from his body. He died later at Grace Hospital and was buried at Hollywood Cemetery.

See also
List of vampires in folklore and mythology

References

External links
Photo of W.W.Pool's grave, Hollywood Cemetery, Richmond, VA
Richmond, Va. Architecture and History - Terror in the Tunnel: Church Hill Tunnel Collapse
Benjamin F. Mosby Memorial at Find A Grave
Hollywood Cemetery History

Vampire
Urban legends
Vampires
Virginia folklore